Noel Morgan (born Edward Noel Morgan; 22 December 1905 — 27 August 1975) was a Welsh cricketer. He was a right-handed batsman who played for Glamorgan. He was born in Garnant and died in Cardiff.

Morgan made a single first-class appearance for the side, during the 1934 season, against Essex. He scored a single run in the only innings in which he batted.

Morgan's brother, Guy, and uncle Teddy, also played cricket for Glamorgan.

External links
Noel Morgan at Cricket Archive 

1905 births
1975 deaths
Welsh cricketers
Glamorgan cricketers
People from Garnant
Cricketers from Carmarthenshire